The Hewett gas field is a large natural gas and associated condensate field located under the North Sea 19 miles (30 km) off the Norfolk coast.

The field 
The Hewett gas field is a natural gas field located in the UK North Sea. The field is named after the Hewett Ledges a sand bank feature beneath which the field is situated. The gas reservoir is a Lower Triassic (Middle and Lower Bunter) sandstone and a Permian Zechstein carbonate bed at a relatively shallow depth of 3,000–4,200 feet (914–1,280 m). The Hewett structure runs north-west to south-east and is about 18 miles long and 3 miles wide (29 km by 4.8 km). It was discovered in October 1966 and extends over blocks: 48/28, 48/29, 48/30, 52/4 and 52/5. To the north are the Big Dottie, Little Dottie and Deborah accumulations, which are separate from Hewett, but are produced through the Hewett topsides facilities. The original determination of the gas in place amounted to 115 billion cubic metres. The field was originally licensed to Phillips Petroleum Exploration UK Ltd (then from 2001 Tullow Oil UK Ltd and from 2008 Eni UK Ltd). Production from the field began in July 1969. Gas and associated condensate are exported from the field via two 30 inch diameter pipelines to the Bacton gas terminal, Norfolk. Eni submitted plans in 2019 to decommission the Hewett field and to remove all installations. The end of production is scheduled for late 2021.

The Hewett gas compositions and properties are as follows.

Development 
The Hewett field has been developed through a number of offshore installations.

Production 
The annual gas production from the Hewett field (in million standard cubic feet) was:

Decommissioning 
In 2020 Eni submitted to the UK Government a proposal for the decommissioning of the Hewett field and its installations. Production from Hewett ceased in 2021.

See also 

 Indefatigable gas field
 Leman gas field
West Sole gas field
Viking gas field

References 

Natural gas fields in the United Kingdom
North Sea energy